Caçu is a municipality in southwest Goiás state, Brazil.

Location
Caçu is part of the Quirinópolis Microregion.  It is located 330 kilometers from the state capital of Goiânia and is crossed by highway GO-206, which links the city with Quirinópolis.  It is almost directly south of Rio Verde, 99 km away.

Highway connections from Goiânia are by BR-060 / Guapó / Indiara / Acreúna / Rio Verde / GO-174/GO-422 / Aparecida do Rio Doce / BR-364/GO-206. See Sepin

Geography
The relief of the municipality is made up of a plateau and several hills.  Belonging to the Paranaíba River system, it is crossed by the Claro, Verdinho, and the Paranaíba itself.  The climate is tropical with two well-defined seasons—the dry season, from May to the end of September, and the rainy season, from September to April.

The temperature varies between 18 °C and 35 °C, with an average of 25 °C; in the months of June and July the minimum temperature can fall to 0 °C, although this is rare.

Demographics
Population density in 2007: 4.84 inhabitants/km2
Population growth rate 1996/2007: 0.41.%
Total population in 2007: 10,892
Total population in 1980: 10,739
Urban population in 2007: 6,543
Rural population in 2007: 2,349
Population change: the population has increased by about 150 inhabitants since 1980.

The economy
The economy is based on cattle raising and soybean growing.  The region had 211,000 head of cattle including 15,900 milking cows (2006).  The extensive cattle raising and mechanized agriculture provide few jobs for the local population and the population density is sparse.
Industrial units: 15
Retail commercial units: 161
Dairies: Laticínios Itarumã e Comércio Ltda., Coop. Agrop. dos Prod. Rurais de Iturama. (22/05/2006)
Financial institutions: Banco do Brasil S.A., BRADESCO S.A. (August/2007)

Farm Data (2006)in ha.
Number of farms:                736
Total area:                  159,640
Area of permanent crops:        132
Area of perennial crops:     1,457
Area of natural pasture:     123,220
Persons dependent on farming: 2,100
Farms with tractors:            171  IBGE
Corn: 300 ha.
Rice: 250 ha.
Soybeans: 700 ha.

Health and education
Infant mortality rate in 2000: 16.89
Hospitals (2007): 01 with 29 beds
Literacy rate in 2000: 86.8
Schools: 13
Enrollment: 2,771
Higher education: none in 2006

Ranking on the Municipal Human Development Index:  0.783
State ranking:  25 (out of 242 municipalities)
National ranking:  972 (out of 5,507 municipalities) Frigoletto

History
The region was first settled by Europeans in 1858 when two brothers, Pedro and Paulo de Sequeira, coming from Minas Gerais established themselves on the right bank of the Rio Claro.  Twenty-six years later Manuel José de Castro, with other families, started the first cattle ranch called Caçu, because of the great quantity of liquorice (alcaçuz), a medicinal plant, growing in the region.  The cattle ranch became a village in 1915 with the construction of a chapel.  The first name was Água Fria, being built on the banks of the stream with that name.  In 1924 it became a district of  Jataí with the name of Caçu, achieving its municipal independence in 1953.

See also
List of municipalities in Goiás

References

External links
 Frigoletto

Municipalities in Goiás